Burdett is a locality in South Australia located on the eastern side (left bank) of the Murray River about  to the east of the city of Murray Bridge and about  east south-east of the Adelaide city centre.  Its name is derived from the Hundred of Burdett.

While the name has been "long established," Burdett's current boundaries were established in 2000. The Karoonda Highway passes through the locality on its way to Loxton. Burdett is located within the federal Division of Barker, the electoral district of Hammond and the local government areas of the Mid Murray Council and the Rural City of Murray Bridge.

See also
List of cities and towns in South Australia

References

 

Towns in South Australia